The 30th New York Infantry Regiment, or officially "30th Regiment New York Volunteer Infantry," was an infantry regiment in the Union Army during the American Civil War from the state of New York. It was a part of the famed Eastern Iron Brigade in the Army of the Potomac.

The 30th New York was mustered into service on June 1, 1861, and mustered out of service on June 18, 1863, following expiration of its enlistment term. Col. Edward Frisby initially commanded the regiment, which was organized in Troy, New York. Originally enlisted soldiers for two-year enlistments and later received 3-year men, who were later folded into the 76th New York Infantry on May 24, 1863.

Total strength and casualties
The regiment suffered 6 officers and 72 enlisted men who were killed in action or mortally wounded and 3 officers and 31 enlisted men who died of disease, for a total of 111 fatalities.

Commanders
Colonel Edward Frisby Born in 1827, Frisby had a long distinguished record in the New York State Militia, retiring in 1860 with the rank of Brigadier General.  He was commissioned in 1861 to lead the newly formed 30th Volunteers.  He was killed at the 2nd Battle of Bull Run on August 29, 1862. He is buried in the Albany Rural Cemetery.

Diaries 
At least two enlisted men kept diaries during the time they served with the 30th New York - John Gordon Morrison (Morrison was later awarded the Congressional Medal of Honor for his service in the River War) and James Reed. Both men were Irish-born residents of Lansingburgh, New York who joined the unit at the time of its creation.  Their daily entries provide a great deal of information about ordinary soldiers' day-to-day experience of the first months of the war.

See also

List of New York Civil War regiments

Notes

External links
State of New York Civil War Records Website
The Civil War Archive

Eastern Iron Brigade
Infantry 030
1861 establishments in New York (state)
Military units and formations established in 1861
Military units and formations disestablished in 1863